Christopher Ryan Collins (born April 19, 1974) is an American basketball coach who is currently the head men's coach at Northwestern University. Collins previously served as associate head coach of the Duke University men's basketball team and is the son of National Basketball Association (NBA) player, coach, and commentator Doug Collins.

Playing career
At Glenbrook North High School  in Northbrook, Illinois, Collins played on the varsity basketball and won Illinois Mr. Basketball and McDonald's All American honors. After high school, he went on to play at Duke University. Collins received many honors for his play at Duke and was named to the All-ACC rookie team as a freshman in 1993. During his senior year, he was team captain, named Second Team All-ACC and also was awarded the Swett-Baylin Memorial Trophy, which is a trophy for Duke's MVP.

After graduating from Duke, he played professional basketball in Finland for two years.

Coaching career
Collins returned to the United States and became an assistant coach in the Women's National Basketball Association (WNBA) for the Detroit Shock for one year under head coach Nancy Lieberman; and at Seton Hall for two years under head coach Tommy Amaker. In 2000, he returned to his alma mater at Duke under Mike Krzyzewski as an assistant coach and was promoted to associate coach in the summer of 2008.

He was instrumental in Duke's signing of Jon Scheyer, a fellow Glenbrook North Mr. Basketball winner (2006), who, like Collins, had also considered attending Illinois. Scheyer, who Collins was key in luring to Duke, became head coach of the Blue Devils with Mike Krzyzewski's retirement following the 2021-2022 season.

When Bill Carmody was fired as head coach of Northwestern in March 2013, Collins was immediately mentioned as a primary target. Collins' hiring was announced March 27, 2013.  After three years of gradual improvement, the 2016–17 season saw Collins lead the Wildcats to their best season since before World War II. The Wildcats finished with their first winning Big Ten Conference record in 49 years, earned their first NCAA Tournament appearance in school history, and went on to win their first NCAA Tournament game. Northwestern had been the only member of a power conference to have never made the tournament.

Head coaching record

References

External links
 Northwestern profile
 Duke profile

1974 births
Living people
American expatriate basketball people in Finland
American men's basketball coaches
American men's basketball players
American women's basketball coaches
Basketball coaches from Illinois
Basketball players from Illinois
College men's basketball head coaches in the United States
Detroit Shock coaches
Duke Blue Devils men's basketball players
Duke Blue Devils men's basketball coaches
Glenbrook North High School alumni
Guards (basketball)
McDonald's High School All-Americans
Northwestern Wildcats men's basketball coaches
Seton Hall Pirates men's basketball coaches
Sportspeople from Cook County, Illinois